Rausu can refer to:

 Mount Rausu, volcano in Hokkaidō, Japan
 Rausu, Hokkaidō, town in the same prefecture